Christopher Gillis (February 26, 1951 in Montreal – August 7, 1993 in New York City) was an important gay male dancer and choreographer and member of the Paul Taylor Dance Company.

Early life and career 
Born in Montreal, Quebec, the son of the late Gene Gillis, a US Olympic skier, and Rhona Wurtele, a Canadian Olympic skier who competed in the 1948 Winter Olympics along with her twin sister Rhoda. His sister, Margie Gillis, is also a dancer and choreographer; they were dance partners from childhood and collaborated on numerous shows.  His brother, Jere Gillis, played professional hockey from 1977 to 1987 for the Vancouver Canucks, New York Rangers, Quebec Nordiques, Buffalo Sabres, and the Philadelphia Flyers.

Gillis studied with Finis Jhung, with Paul Taylor and with choreographers May O'Donnell and Norman Walker. He performed with José Limón's company.

He joined the Paul Taylor Dance Company in 1976 in New York City. He lived and worked in New York for the next seventeen years. He was designated Taylor's heir-apparent.

His works have been performed by the Paul Taylor company, the White Oak Dance Project and the Fairfax Ballet.

He died from AIDS complications at the age of 42.

Works

As choreographer
Ne Me Quitte Pas 1993
Landscape 1993
Ghost Stories (around 1985?)
Andalusian Green 1992
Icarus At Night 1991
Curbs & Corridors 1990
Luvs Alphabet 1989
Spell It Out 1988
Paean 1987
VeRS La Glace 1986
Thin Ice 1982

As dancer
Fact and Fancy 3 Epitaphs & All / choreographed by Paul Taylor 1991
Of Bright & Blue Birds & the Gala Sun  1990
The Sorcerer's Sofa / choreographed by Paul Taylor 1989
Minikin Fair / choreographed by Paul Taylor 1989
Speaking in Tongues / choreographed by Paul Taylor 1988
Danbury Mix / choreographed by Paul Taylor 1988
Counterswarm / choreographed by Paul Taylor 1988
Brandenburgs / choreographed by Paul Taylor 1988
Syzygy / choreographed by Paul Taylor 1987
Kith and Kin / choreographed by Paul Taylor 1987
A Musical Offering / choreographed by Paul Taylor 1986
Ab Ovo Usque Ad Mala (From Soup to Nuts) / choreographed by Paul Taylor 1986
Roses / choreographed by Paul Taylor 1985
Byzantium / choreographed by Paul Taylor 1984
Equinox / choreographed by Paul Taylor 1983
Snow White / choreographed by Paul Taylor 1983
Sunset / choreographed by Paul Taylor 1983
Mecuric Tidings / choreographed by Paul Taylor 1982
Lost, Found and Lost / choreographed by Paul Taylor 1981
House of Cards / choreographed by Paul Taylor 1981
Arden Court / choreographed by Paul Taylor 1981
Le Sacre du Printemps (the Rehearsal) / choreographed by Paul Taylor 1980
Profiles / choreographed by Paul Taylor 1979
Nightshade / choreographed by Paul Taylor 1979
Diggity / choreographed by Paul Taylor 1978
Airs / choreographed by Paul Taylor 1978
Aphrodisiamania / choreographed by Paul Taylor 1977
Dust / choreographed by Paul Taylor) 1977
Images / choreographed by Paul Taylor) 1977
Polaris / choreographed by Paul Taylor) 1976
Cloven Kingdom / choreographed by Paul Taylor) 1976

Film
Eye on Dance, Produced by: Celia Ipiotis. Documentary/Interview with Margie and Christopher Gillis, ARC Videodance NY 1990

Resources
Memorial Service
Article and photo on AWA

Notes

Further reading
He is mentioned in the books:
Moving Words: Re-Writing Dance, by Gary Morris
Beyond Shame: Reclaiming the Abandoned History of Radical Gay Sexuality, by Patrick Moore
The American Dance Festival, by Jack Anderson

1951 births
1993 deaths
Canadian contemporary dancers
Canadian choreographers
Modern dancers
Canadian LGBT entertainers
AIDS-related deaths in New York (state)
LGBT dancers
Entertainers from Montreal
Canadian male dancers
20th-century Canadian LGBT people